Steve Murray (born 9 October 1944) is a Scottish former footballer who played as a midfielder. He spent the majority of his career in the north-east of Scotland, with Dundee and Aberdeen. Murray also enjoyed success with Glasgow club Celtic and represented Scotland once. He later managed Forfar Athletic and Montrose.

Playing career 
Murray began his career in the early 1960s with Dundee, spending six years at Dens Park and picking up runners-up medals in both domestic cup competitions, making around 200 appearances in total.

In 1970, he became Aberdeen's record signing in a £50,000 deal, missing the 1970 Scottish Cup Final due to being cup-tied but winning a solitary Scotland cap in 1971, coincidentally in a fixture played at Pittodrie. Following Martin Buchan's departure to Manchester United, Murray became captain.

He moved to Celtic in a £55,000 deal in May 1973 after a contractual disagreement. Murray won all three domestic competitions during his two years at Celtic Park, retiring due to a toe injury in early 1976.

Murray joined Dundee United in 1979 as a scout but after having acupuncture treatment was able to resume his playing career and made three league appearances, also appearing as a substitute in the Scottish League Cup Final that year.

Management

In 1980, Murray began his managerial career with Forfar Athletic, but resigned one training session and three days later. He returned to management two years later with Montrose; however he left to pursue a career in banking.

Murray then returned to former club Dundee United as assistant manager in July 1989. However he had a fall-out with then manager Jim McLean (a teammate in the 1967 Scottish League Cup Final). Murray left before the end of the year, later winning a "substantial sum" in a court action.

Family

Murray, whose son Chris was a youth player at Dundee United, Celtic and had coaching spells with Dundee and Brechin City, has now retired from banking and now concentrates on his painting.

Honours

Dundee
 Scottish Cup Runner-up: 1
 1963–64
 Scottish League Cup Runner-up: 1
 1967–68

Celtic
 Scottish League Division One: 1
 1973–74
 Scottish Cup: 2
 1973–74, 1974–75
 Scottish League Cup: 1
 1974–75

Dundee United
 Scottish League Cup: 1
 1979–80

References

External links
 
 

1944 births
Sportspeople from Dumbarton
Footballers from West Dunbartonshire
Living people
Scottish footballers
Scotland international footballers
Scottish Football League players
Scottish football managers
Dundee F.C. players
Aberdeen F.C. players
Celtic F.C. players
Dundee United F.C. players
Forfar Athletic F.C. managers
Montrose F.C. managers
Dundee United F.C. non-playing staff
Association football midfielders
Scotland under-23 international footballers
Scottish Football League managers